Gan is a village in Lillestrøm municipality in Viken, Norway. Gan is located close to the eastern shore of lake Øyeren, between Fetsund and Trøgstad.

Villages in Akershus